Horeh-ye Agul-e Bala (also Romanized as Horeh-ye ʿĀgūl-e Bālā) is a village in Hoveyzeh Rural District, in the Central District of Hoveyzeh County, Khuzestan Province, Iran. At the 2006 census, its population was 696, in 117 families.

References 

Populated places in Hoveyzeh County